Bruce Hart may refer to:

 Bruce Hart (songwriter) (1938–2006), American songwriter and screenwriter
 Bruce Hart (wrestler) (born 1950), Canadian wrestler